Expedition 25 was the 25th long-duration mission to the International Space Station (ISS). Expedition 25 began with the Soyuz TMA-18 undocking on 25 September 2010. Three new crewmembers (Scott Kelly, Alexander Kaleri and Oleg Skripochka) arrived aboard the ISS 10 October 2010 on Soyuz TMA-01M to join Douglas Wheelock, Fyodor Yurchikhin and Shannon Walker, and formed the full six member crew of Expedition 25. NASA astronaut Doug Wheelock accepted command of Expedition 25 on 22 September 2010, taking over from Russia's Aleksandr Skvortsov. The departure of Wheelock, Walker and Yurchikhin on 25 November 2010 marked the official end of Expedition 25.

During Expedition 25 Progress M-08M spacecraft visited the ISS, docking with the space station on 30 October 2010 bringing 2.5 tons of cargo supplies. Space shuttle Discovery on STS-133 mission was scheduled to arrive at the ISS on 3 November 2010 but was rescheduled for launch on 3 February 2011. The 10th anniversary of human life, work and research on the ISS fell during Expedition 25. On 2 November 2000, Expedition 1 Commander William Shepherd and Flight Engineers Sergei Krikalev and Yuri Gidzenko became the first residents of the space station. Expedition 25 ended on 26 November.

Crew 

Source NASA

Backup crew 
 Andrei Borisenko – Commander
 Paolo Nespoli
 Catherine Coleman
 Anatoli Ivanishin
 Sergei Revin
 Ronald J. Garan, Jr.

Preflight preparations 

At the Baikonur Cosmodrome in Kazakhstan, Expedition 25 Soyuz Commander Alexander Kaleri, NASA Flight Engineer Scott Kelly and Russian Flight Engineer Oleg Skripochka participated in a variety of activities from 26 September to 4 October 2010 as they prepared for their launch on 8 October 2010 (7 October 2010 U.S. Eastern time) in their Soyuz TMA-01M spacecraft to the International Space Station. The footage includes the crew's arrival in Baikonur, their suited and unsuited fit checks in their Soyuz spacecraft, the raising of flags outside their Cosmonaut Hotel crew quarters and other traditional activities. The Soyuz TMA-01M spacecraft was mated to its booster in a processing facility for its rollout to the launch pad in Baikonur 5 October 2010.

The Soyuz TMA-01M spacecraft and booster rocket were moved to Launch Complex 5 (Complex 17P32-5) at Baikonur Cosmodrome on a rail-car 5 October 2010 for final preparations prior to launch.

Experiments

Russian Federal Space Agency revealed that during Expedition 25 and 26, 504 sessions of 41 experiments (34 experiments from previous Expeditions and seven new experiments) are planned to be implemented. The new experiments include, Molniya-Gamma, Sprut-2, UHF-radiometry, SLS, VIRU, Test and Colon Crystal.

Experiments to be carried out include:

Mission highlights

Progress M-05M undocking
The Russian resupply spacecraft Progress M-05M, which came to the station in May 2010, was undocked on 25 October 2010 to make room for another resupply spacecraft – Progress M-08M.

Progress M-08M
Progress M-08M spacecraft delivered about 2.5 tons of cargo supplies including water, air, fuel and hardware for the Russian Molniya-Gamma and Coulomb Crystal experiments to the station.

The Soyuz-U carrier rocket with Progress M-08M, identified by NASA as Progress 40 or 40P, was launched from the Baikonur's Gagarin's launch pad at 15:11:50 UTC on 27 October 2010. After three days of autonomous flight, at 16:36 UTC on 30 October 2010 Progress M-08M docked with the Pirs module nadir port. A problem during Progress' approach to the space station forced cosmonauts on the station to intervene. During station-keeping as part of the rendezvous operations, flight controllers in Moscow instructed cosmonaut Alexander Kaleri to activate the TORU manual docking equipment and take over the piloting tasks from the Progress' autonomous KURS system. The switch to manual mode was decided at range of 194 m. Kaleri worked inside the space station's Zvezda module to fly Progress M-08M remotely using television views and a pair of joysticks and guided it to the successful docking.

Spacewalks 

‡ denotes spacewalks performed from the Pirs docking compartment in Russian Orlan suits.

References

External links 

 NASA's Space Station Expeditions page
 Expedition 25 photography

Expeditions to the International Space Station
2010 in spaceflight